Hilton bombing may refer to:
London Hilton bombing, 1975.
Sydney Hilton Hotel bombing, 1978.